"An American Dream" is a song written by Rodney Crowell. He recorded it under the title "Voilá, An American Dream" on his 1978 album Ain't Living Long Like This, and released it as the B-side to that album's single "(Now and Then There's) A Fool Such as I".

The Dirt Band recording
It was later recorded by American country-rock music group the Nitty Gritty Dirt Band, but using the shortened name "The Dirt Band." It was released in November 1979 as the only single and title track from the album An American Dream. The song reached number 58 on the Billboard Hot Country Singles & Tracks chart, number 13 on the U.S. Billboard Hot 100, and number 16 on the Adult Contemporary chart. In Canada, it reached number three.  The Nitty Gritty Dirt Band's version features a backing vocal from Linda Ronstadt; as such, it is sometimes included in Ronstadt greatest hits collections, such as the 2014 Capitol release, Icon.

The labels on some of the 45 rpm records were reversed, so that "An American Dream" was labeled "Take Me Back" and vice versa.

Track listing
7" single - North America (1979)
 "An American Dream" - 3:50
 "Take Me Back" - 3:01

Chart performance

Weekly charts

Year-end charts

Other cover versions
The song was adapted into Norwegian as "Ein nordmann sin draum" by Olav Stedje.
In the Philippines, the song was adapted by Fred Panopio as "Turistang Bilmoko."

References

1978 songs
1979 singles
1980 singles
Nitty Gritty Dirt Band songs
Rodney Crowell songs
Songs written by Rodney Crowell
United Artists Records singles